The Road to Hell is the fifth studio album recorded by Sunstorm featuring American singer Joe Lynn Turner, with production from Hardline's Italian multi-instrumentalist Alessandro Del Vecchio. It is the only album with Edo Sala on drums and the last to feature founding vocalist Turner.

It was released via Frontiers Records on June 8, 2018 and it was preceded by the singles "Only The Good Will Survive" on April 16, 2018 and "The Road to Hell" on May 16, 2018.

Track listing

Personnel
Sunstorm
Joe Lynn Turner - vocals
Alessandro Del Vecchio - keyboards, Hammond organ, backing vocals, production, recording, mixing, mastering
Simone Mularoni - guitars, recording
Nik Mazzucconi - bass guitar
Edo Sala - drums

Additional personnel
Serafino Perugino - executive producer
Maya Kozyrava - vocal co-production, management
Derek Saxenmeyer - vocals recording
Maor Appelbaum - remastering
Andrea Seveso - assistant
Giulio Cataldo - art direction 
Nello Dell'Omo - artwork
Mark Weiss - JLT photos

References

2018 albums
Sunstorm (band) albums
Frontiers Records albums